Coreoblemus is a genus of beetles in the family Carabidae, containing the following species:

 Coreoblemus miyamai Ueno, 2007
 Coreoblemus namkungi Park, Lafer & Sone, 2002
 Coreoblemus parvicollis Ueno, 1969
 Coreoblemus sejimai Ueno, 2007
 Coreoblemus venustus Ueno, 1969

References

Trechinae